Erebus strigipennis is a moth of the family Erebidae. It is found in India (Meghalaya), Cambodia and Vietnam.

References

Moths described in 1883
Erebus (moth)